Globauridae is a family of extinct scincomorph lizards that first appeared in the Late Jurassic of England and persisting until the Late Cretaceous of Mongolia. The group is distinguished by having a diploglossopalatinar palate anatomy, lacking osteoderms, having conical two- or three-cusped teeth, and a unique postorbital-parietal contact. The type genus Globaura was originally classified within the now-polyphyletic group Lacertoidea, before being reclassified within its own family within Ardeosauroidea. However, Meyasaurus has also been found to be closer to Barbatteiidae.

References

Scincomorpha
Jurassic lizards
Cretaceous lizards
Prehistoric reptile families